Hardy is the 2nd oldest city in Sharp and Fulton counties in the U.S. state of Arkansas. The population was 765 in 2020.

Geography
Hardy is located at  (36.320553, -91.480645).

The Spring River, which begins in Mammoth Spring, flows through Hardy. The Spring River flows into the Black River, which flows into the White River, and the White River eventually empties into the Mississippi River.

U.S. Route 63 is the main highway which runs through the town. In its course through Arkansas, Route 63 runs from the Missouri state line at Mammoth Spring to connect with Interstate 55 near Gilmore.

When roads were poor and travel much more difficult, Hardy was one of two county seats of Sharp County. The other was Evening Shade. In 1963, Ash Flat was named the county seat, and Hardy and Evening Shade lost that designation.

Hardy is served by the BNSF Railway. In 1980, the much larger Burlington Northern acquired the Frisco and integrated it into its own system.

History
In the early 1950s, the Horrell and Clay families both had grocery stores there.  Conway Horn ran a general mercantile store.  Charles Cone ran the Western Auto Store.  Two places to eat were Bonnie's Cafe and Mrs. Rogers' sundries store.  Arthur Snow was a pharmacist and owned a drugstore.  The agent for the Frisco Railroad was Virgil L. Walker, Jr.  Dink Booth was the barber.  The Thomsons ran the movie theater, and Ben Dalton published a newspaper.  Ottie Cate ran a poultry and ice house, and Bill Shaver had the Standard Oil service station. Tom Walker was in charge of the local bank, and Woodrow Wilson ran a Mobil service station.  "Peavine" Clouse was the city marshal.  "Guinea" Gray was a local painter, and Clifford Brummet had the contract to carry the mail between the post office and the arriving trains.  He also had a farm near Hardy. Arthur Garner sold real estate.  Dewey Dark ran the Rose Hill Resort.  Doctor Miller was a local medical doctor. Leonard Johns worked at the Post Office.

The Discovery Channel reality television series Clash of the Ozarks is set in Hardy. The program focuses on the lives of the people in the community.

Demographics

2020 census

As of the 2020 United States census, there were 743 people, 352 households, and 181 families residing in the city.

2000 census
As of the census of 2000, there were 578 people, 298 households, and 159 families residing in the city. The racial makeup of the city was 95.33% White, 1.04% Native American, 0.52% Asian, and 3.11% from two or more races.  0.52% of the population were Hispanic or Latino of any race.

There were 298 households, of which 17.4% had children under the age of 18 living with them, 40.9% were married couples living together, 9.7% had a female householder with no husband present, and 46.6% were non-families. 43.6% of all households were made up of individuals, and 23.8% had someone living alone who was 65 years of age or older.  The average household size was 1.94 and the average family size was 2.67.

In the city, the population was spread out, with 16.8% under the age of 18, 6.9% from 18 to 24, 20.4% from 25 to 44, 27.9% from 45 to 64, and 28.0% who were 65 years of age or older.  The median age was 49 years. For every 100 females, there were 79.5 males.  For every 100 females age 18 and over, there were 73.6 males.

The median income for a household in the city was $17,375, and the median income for a family was $25,500. Males had a median income of $20,208 versus $17,857 for females. The per capita income for the city was $12,204.  About 12.2% of families and 23.4% of the population were below the poverty line, including 23.6% of those under age 18 and 28.6% of those age 65 or over.

Education
It is served by the Highland School District, which operates Highland High School. The Highland district was formed from the 1962 consolidation of the Ash Flat School District and the Hardy School District. Due to the previous rivalry between the two districts, some members of the community were unsure whether the vote to consolidate would succeed.

Notable people
 The Wilburn Brothers Doyle and Teddy born here in 1930 and 1931.
Session guitarist Louie Shelton also grew up at Hardy, and watched the Wilburn Brothers on their live radio show. He was awarded into the US Hall of Fame as a renowned guitarist and has a strong of hits to his name. He has resided on the Gold Coast Australia for the past 40 years.

References

External links
Hardy Arkansas Online Resource Guide
Hardy in the Encyclopedia of Arkansas History & Culture
Official City Web Site

Cities in Sharp County, Arkansas
Cities in Fulton County, Arkansas
Cities in Arkansas